Accurate Miniatures is an American manufacturer of scale plastic model kits. It is owned by Collins-Habovick, LLC and is located in Concord, North Carolina, United States. Their products primarily consist plastic model airplane kits from World War II, though they also make model kits of planes and automobiles from other eras.

History
The original Accurate Miniatures was a Charlotte, North Carolina based plastic model company that began business in the mid-1990s. They filed for bankruptcy in June 2001. Later that year, Accurate Miniatures was purchased from the original owners by Hobby Investors LLC, now called Collins-Habovick, LLC. The transfer included the sale of the company name, logo, inventory, and intellectual property. Paul Bedford, former general manager of the original Accurate Miniatures, claims the deal was part cash and part debt assumption.

In July 2001, Accurate Miniatures, in an attempt to get out of debt, prepared to sell as much as 70% of their tooling (model molds) to the Bologna, Italy based Italeri. Some of the molds included molds for the Avenger, Dauntless, Grumman F3F, Mustang, Stormovik, and Yak kits. However, the sale to Hobby Investors LLC nullified this deal.

Unseen to Collins-Habovick was the financial disaster left by the previous management. When the previous management ceased operation, substantial debt remained behind. Mold sets like the B-25 and F-3F were not paid off completely, and mold commitments for the NASCAR stock car, SB2U, and an R-4 were not funded at all even though a fair amount of tooling had been complete. All of this (not including unpaid artists, printers, and many others) had to be overcome before anything else could be achieved.

Only through the diligent work and patience of the small staff was Accurate Miniatures able to be resurrected to become a successful company that is praised by model builders for their high-quality kits and attention to detail.

Products

Aircraft
Accurate Miniatures produces model kits of these airplanes:

1:48 Scale
 Bell P-39Q Airacobra
 Bell P-400 Airacobra
 Bristol Beaufighter NF.I Nightfighter
 Bristol Beaufighter VIc
 Bristol Beaufighter TF.X
 Curtiss SB2C-1C Helldiver 
 Curtiss SB2C-4E Helldiver
 Douglas SBD-1 Dauntless 
 Douglas SBD-2 Dauntless
 Douglas SBD-3 Dauntless
 Douglas SBD-4 Dauntless
 Douglas SBD-5 Dauntless
 Focke-Wulf Fw 190A-8
 Goodyear F2G Corsair
 Grumman F3F-1
 Grumman F3F-2
 Grumman Gulfhawk II
 Grumman TBM-3 Avenger
 Grumman TBF-1C Avenger
 Ilyushin Il-2M3 Shturmovik
 Yakovlev Yak-1
 North American A-36A Apache
 North American B-25B Mitchell (Doolittle Raider)
 North American B-25C/D Mitchell
 North American B-25G Mitchell
 North American Mustang Mk.Ia
 North American F-6A Mustang
 North American P-51A Mustang
 North American P-51C Mustang
 North American P-51D Mustang
 Republic P-47D-5-RE Thunderbolt
 Vought SB2U-1 Vindicator
 Vought SB2U-2 Vindicator
 Vought SB2U-3 Vindicator

1:72 Scale
 Boeing F4B-4
 Curtiss P-6E Hawk
 Curtiss P-40N Warhawk
 General Atomics RQ-1 Predator
 McDonnell-Douglas F-4C/D Phantom II
 McDonnell-Douglas F-4J Phantom II
 North American P-51B Mustang

1:100 Scale
 Bell AH-1G Cobra
 Bell UH-1B Huey
 Boeing AH-64 Apache
 Messerschmitt Bf 109F
 North American P-51D Mustang
 Sikorsky HH-60 Nighthawk
 Sikorsky SH-60B Seahawk
 Sikorsky UH-60 Black Hawk
 Supermarine Spitfire Mk. Vb

Automobiles
Accurate Miniatures produced model kits of these automobiles:

1:24 Scale
 Corvette Grand Sport
 McLaren M8B (3 versions)

Miscellaneous
 1/24 scale model automobile wheels
 1/48 scale model aircraft decals and accessories

External links
MRC's page about AM and its products

References

Model manufacturers of the United States
Toy cars and trucks
Design companies established in 2003
Toy soldier manufacturing companies
Manufacturing companies established in 2003
2003 establishments in North Carolina